Ramakant is a given name. Notable people with the name include:

Ramakant Achrekar (1932–2019), Indian cricket coach from Mumbai
Ramakant Angle, Indian politician
Ramakant Desai (1939–1998), represented India in Test cricket as fast bowler
Ramakant Goswami (born 1944), the member of Legislative Assembly of Delhi from Rajendra Nagar
Ramakant Khalap (born 1947), Indian politician from Goa, India
Ramakant Mishra a former IAS officer and scholar who died of a heart attack in 2011 in New Delhi
Ramakant Rath (born 1934), one of the most renowned modernist poets in the Oriya literature
 Ramakant Yadav (politician) (born 1957), Indian politician
 Ramakant Yadav (neurologist), professor of neurology

Indian masculine given names
Hindu given names